Serhiy Romanchuk (born 6 June 1982) is a Ukrainian-born professional strongman competitor and national champion powerlifter. He has competed in the 2010 World's Strongest Man and 2010 Europe's Strongest Man contests. On Dec. 18, 2010 he won the Strongman Champions League event in Kyiv, Ukraine.

Romanchuk won the Giants Live Ukraine event in Poltava, Ukraine on Aug. 25, 2011. This victory qualified him for the 2011 World's Strongest Man contest.

He is a 2 time UPO Ukrainian National Powerlifting Champion in 2007 & 2012.

Following the 2014 Russian aggression against Ukraine, Romanchuk stayed in Makiivka where he heads a local sports club "Medvedi" (Bears).

See also 
 Strongman Champions League
 IFSA
 Alexey Vishnitsky
 Vasyl Virastyuk

References

1982 births
Living people
Sportspeople from Makiivka
Ukrainian strength athletes